Free Radicals is a black-and-white animated film short by avant-garde filmmaker Len Lye. Begun in 1958 and completed in 1979, Lye made the film by directly scratching the film stock. The resulting "figures of motion" are set to music by the Baguirmi tribe of Africa.

Production
In Experimental Animation: the origins of a new art, Len Lye recalled making Free Radicals:
"I made Free Radicals from 16mm black film leader, which you can get from DuPont. I took a graver, various kinds of needles. (My range included arrowheads for romanticism.) You stick down the sides with scotch tape and you get to work with scratching the stuff out. … … You hold your hand at the right height and act is if you were making your signature. It goes on forever. You can carry a pictographic design in your head and make a little design. You can't see what you're doing because your hand is in the way. That's why those things have that kind of spastic look."

Legacy
In 2008, the film was included in the annual selection of 25 motion pictures added to the National Film Registry of the Library of Congress being deemed "culturally, historically, or aesthetically significant" and recommended for preservation.

Free Radicals appears on the DVD Rhythms, a collection of short films by Lye.

See also
 List of avant-garde films of the 1950s
 Independent animation
 1979 in film

References

External links
 Official Website
 
 
 
 Free Radicals on MUBI
 Free Radicals essay by Daniel Eagan in America's Film Legacy: The Authoritative Guide to the Landmark Movies in the National Film Registry, A&C Black, 2010 , pages 761-762 

1979 films
1979 animated films
1970s American animated films
1970s animated short films
American animated short films
American avant-garde and experimental films
American black-and-white films
United States National Film Registry films
Drawn-on-film animated films
Films directed by Len Lye